Kelly Marie Carlin (born June 15, 1963) is an American radio host, producer, screenwriter and actress.

Biography
Carlin was born on June 15, 1963 in Dayton, Ohio, the only child of comedian George Carlin and his first wife, Brenda Hosbrook. She began her career in entertainment as a production assistant and photographer for two of her father's early HBO specials: George Carlin: Again! and Carlin on Campus. By 1993, she had left her first husband and graduated from UCLA with a B.A. in Communications Studies. Carlin is a Buddhist.

In 1994, Carlin co-wrote the episode "George Pulls the Plug" for the second season of The George Carlin Show with her second husband, Robert McCall. She also co-wrote the script for the 1998 film Devil in the Flesh starring Rose McGowan. In the late 1990s, she began to stray away from mainstream media and began writing, producing and hosting an early Internet series, as well as performing a one-person show entitled "Driven to Distraction" about her childhood, struggles with drugs and alcohol, poor personal relationships, and her mother's untimely death in May 1997. In 2001, she earned a master's degree in Jungian depth psychology and expressed an interest in becoming a therapist, but later returned to stage performing.
 
After her father's death in June 2008, Carlin had initially discussed publishing an oral history of her father's life based on stories by friends and family. By December 2009, however, she had shelved that project and began to focus on her own memoirs. She also began interviewing legendary comedians in the "On Comedy" CD series for Marshall Berle's Laugh.com, of which her father was one of the founding partners.

Carlin has regularly performed her one-person show A Carlin Home Companion (a play on A Prairie Home Companion by Garrison Keillor), detailing her experiences growing up with her famous father. She was also a producer for the second season of The Green Room with Paul Provenza in 2011, and for a time hosted The Kelly Carlin Show on Sirius XM Radio's Raw Dog Comedy, and Waking From The American Dream on SModcast Internet Radio. Her book, A Carlin Home Companion: Growing Up With George was published in 2015. In 2022, a 4 hour documentary she had a part in creating and starring in, George Carlin's American Dream was released on HBO Max. It was directed by Judd Apatow and Michael Bonfiglio. In May of 2022, Kelly Carlin and Judd Apatow were interviewed on MSNBC to discuss the project.

References

External links 

Waking from the American Dream, Carlin-McCall's podcast

George Carlin
1963 births
Living people
20th-century American dramatists and playwrights
21st-century American dramatists and playwrights
American Buddhists
American podcasters
American women podcasters
Screenwriters from Ohio
University of California, Los Angeles alumni
Writers from Dayton, Ohio
American Zen Buddhists
Primetime Emmy Award winners